Orthaga exvinacea is a species of snout moth in the genus Orthaga. It is found in India (Nilgiris).

References

Moths described in 1891
Epipaschiinae
Endemic fauna of India